Droit Chemin (French for "straight path") is the first solo studio album by Congolese singer Fally Ipupa. It was released on June 1, 2006. It is also the first album by Fally Ipupa to be produced by David Monsoh (known for his work with names of African music like Koffi Olomide, Papa Wemba, DJ Arafat and throwing Douk Saga and JetSet). On the album, Ipupa collaborated with Krys (musician), Mokobé of 113 and Benji of Nèg' Marrons. Droit Chemin features songs like Liputa, Orgasy and Sopeka. The album went gold for selling more than 100,000 copies in one month.

Track listing
Droit chemin – 7:58
Liputa – 8:21
So.pe.ka (featuring Benji) – 7:53
Associé – 7:59
Mabele – 6:17
Attente – 7:01
100% Love (featuring Barbara Kanam) – 3:20
Orgasy – 7:04
Bakandja – 7:01
Naufra ketch – 6:04
Un prince à Southfork – 5:28
Kidiamfuka – 4:59

References

External links

Fally Ipupa albums
2006 albums
Albums produced by David Monsoh
Albums produced by Fally Ipupa